Tlilpotonqui or Tlilpotoncatzin may refer to:
Tlilpotoncatzin (died 1503), the second cihuacoatl ("president") of Mexico-Tenochtitlan
Diego Tlilpotonqui, a ruler of Tepetlaoztoc who was ruling in 1519 at the start of the Spanish conquest of the Aztec Empire, and converted to Christianity